World of Glass may refer to:

World of Glass (album), an album by the band Tristania
World of Glass (St Helens), a museum in St Helens, Merseyside, England